Chak No.110/7R is a village situated in union council 55 District Chichawatni, Punjab, Pakistan.

See also
Chichawatni
Harappa
Sahiwal

References 

Populated places in Sahiwal District